Alexandre Benedito Messiano (born on 19 February 1979), also known as Alexandre Rotweiller, is a Brazilian retired professional football player who last played for the São Carlos in 2014. He was included in the Brazilian Olympic team at the 2000 Summer Olympics in Sydney.

Career

Club career

He played at the youth team of Rio Branco de Americana. He played for Guarani before arriving in São Paulo where he played from 1997 to 2004.

Olympic career

He was included in the Brazilian Olympic team as a standby player at the 2000 Summer Olympics in Sydney.

References

1979 births
Living people
Footballers from São Paulo (state)
Brazilian footballers
Association football midfielders
Guarani FC players
Rio Branco Esporte Clube players
All Boys footballers
Sport Club Internacional players
Clube Atlético Mineiro players
Sport Club Corinthians Alagoano players
Associação Académica de Coimbra – O.A.F. players
Esporte Clube Noroeste players
América Futebol Clube (RN) players
Botafogo Futebol Clube (SP) players
São José Esporte Clube players
Brazilian expatriate footballers
Brazilian expatriates in Argentina
Expatriate footballers in Argentina
Brazilian expatriates in Portugal
Expatriate footballers in Portugal